The Kharkiv Choral Synagogue is a synagogue located in Kharkiv, Ukraine, the largest in the country, and a building of architectural significance.

History

Construction of the synagogue began in 1909, with architects submitting design proposals as part of contest. St. Petersburg architect Yakov Gevirts submitted the winning design and construction was completed in 1913 at a cost of 150,000 rubles. In June 1923, the synagogue was closed at the insistence of Jewish workers, nationalized by the government, and used by a Jewish worker's club, part of the Comintern. The local Yevsektsiya declared the day a holiday. A march to the synagogue was organized, with a group of Jewish workers carrying a red flag into the building. Moscow's Der Emes declared the synagogue a "counterrevolutionary nest" and claimed that Torah scrolls in the synagogue had been dedicated to the Tsar. The building then served a variety of uses including housing a club, cinema and a sport complex and was not used as a place of worship until 1990.

Following the collapse of the Soviet Union, various Jewish groups struggled for control of the synagogue. Edward Khodos created an organization to represent the members of Reform Judaism and asserted control of the synagogue. Representatives of Chabad made competing claims, and for a period both groups operated in the building. In 1993, Khodos operated on the synagogue's second floor, where according to reports he conducted his antiques business and set up a Friday night kick-boxing club for local children.

In 1998, a fire gutted the synagogue and it was officially turned over to Chabad. Extensive renovations were completed in 2003.

Architecture

The building design is described as a combination of Romano-Gothic, Neo-Gothic, and Islamic architecture styles which the Architectural Society of Kharkiv saw as 'reminiscent of the huge walls of ancient Palestine'.

Unlike the other buildings on the block, it is set back from the street to conform with local laws requiring a certain distance from churches and other houses of worship.

The Synagogue today

The synagogue is a center for Jewish life in Kharkiv and an important city landmark. Jewish holidays are celebrated at the synagogue by Jews and non-Jews alike. A Hanukkah celebration drew Petro Yushchenko, then governor Arsen Avakov, and national media coverage. Other events include a tribute for Kharkiv's Jewish World War II veterans.

The synagogue is run by Chabad, which has its Kharkiv headquarters there and also maintains a mikveh yeshiva ETC. The synagogue's current Rabbi, Moshe Moskovitz, is also the chief rabbi of Kharkiv. Chabad also runs a school of 500 Jewish children in grades 1-11 and a kindergarten of 70 children.

Kharkiv Mayor Hennadiy Kernes has attended a synagogue Purim celebration and the wedding of Rabbi Moskowitz's daughter.

See also
Chobotarska Synagogue

References

1913 establishments in Ukraine
Chabad in Europe
Hasidic Judaism in Ukraine
Hasidic synagogues
Jews and Judaism in Kharkiv
Gothic Revival architecture in Ukraine
Gothic Revival synagogues
Reform Judaism in Europe
Religious buildings and structures in Kharkiv
Synagogues completed in 1913
Synagogues in Ukraine